is a former Japanese football player. He is a left-footed forward.

Club career
After graduating from Narashino High School in Chiba in 1996, he joined J1 League side Nagoya Grampus Eight. He played many matches from 1997 and became a regular player in 1998. He helped the club to win the Sanwa Bank Cup in 1997, 1999 Emperor's Cup and the 2nd place 1996–97 Asian Cup Winners' Cup. However his opportunity to play decreased from 2000. He moved to FC Tokyo in August 2001 and Vegalta Sendai in August 2003.

He moved to Guaraní in Paraguay in 2004 and debuted in February against Cerro Porteño. He set up the goal for his side in their 3-1 defeat.  Starting in 2005, he played for many clubs, including Pachuca Juniors and Irapuato in Mexico, as well as Castellón, Numancia, and Las Palmas in Spain. In August 2008 he moved to Greece and Ionikos FC.

In September 2009, he returned to Japan and signed with his local club Ehime FC. He played for the club from 2010 season because it was past the deadline of the player's registration for 2009 season. He played many matches as captain in 2010. However his opportunity to play decreased and he left the club at the end of the 2012 season.

In 2013, he moved to Hong Kong and signed with Yokohama FC Hong Kong (later Metro Gallery). He played for the club until June 2016 and retired.

National team career
He represented Japan at several underage levels. He was a member of the Japan U-20 national team for the 1997 World Youth Championship hosted by Malaysia. He scored a goal against Costa Rica at the group stage. The team was eliminated at the quarter-final.

Club statistics

References

External links

1977 births
Living people
Association football people from Ehime Prefecture
Japanese footballers
Japan youth international footballers
J1 League players
J2 League players
Nagoya Grampus players
FC Tokyo players
Vegalta Sendai players
Ehime FC players
Japanese expatriate footballers
Japanese expatriate sportspeople in Paraguay
Expatriate footballers in Paraguay
Expatriate footballers in Mexico
Expatriate footballers in Spain
Expatriate footballers in Greece
Club Guaraní players
C.F. Pachuca players
Irapuato F.C. footballers
CD Castellón footballers
CD Numancia players
UD Las Palmas players
Ionikos F.C. players
Hong Kong First Division League players
Expatriate footballers in Hong Kong
Yokohama FC Hong Kong players
Footballers at the 1998 Asian Games
Association football forwards
People from Niihama, Ehime
Asian Games competitors for Japan
Hong Kong League XI representative players